Surquillo District is a district in Lima, Peru. The district is bordered by the districts of San Isidro and San Borja on the north; by Miraflores on the south and west; and by Santiago de Surco on the east.

Due to its central position, Surquillo is a very commercially active district, havings several businesses, most of which are hardware and construction material shops. Some car selling companies as well as Corporación Graña y Montero, one of the largest Peruvian consulting companies, are located in the district.

Although Surquillo is completely surrounded by upscale districts, it is mostly a lower-middle class district with some working-class neighborhoods. The old town area of Surquillo is known to be dangerous and tourists are discouraged from walking there alone, as it is rife with thieves and gang violence. Nonetheless, some parts of Surquillo's residential area have lower crime rates and a higher standard of living, such as Barrio Medico, Calera de la Merced and Limatambo.

Also found Residencial San Pedro (across the park or Morococha "Paul Harris") located in block 13 of jiron San Pedro, which consists of seven parts.

Surquillo appears on the map as a general bow tie shape, being the combination of one trapezoidal area and the area of a triangle pointing down, with Tomás Marsano Ave. as their divider. The trapezoidal area is the old-town district, made up of nearly evenly spaced blocks, while the inverted triangle is the new district, made of mostly residential zones with curving streets and uneven spacing between blocks. In 1983, Surquillo lost more than half of its territory, as the district of San Borja was created in the northern part of the district.

Regarding gastronomy, in Surquillo there is a dish called "salchichaufa". It consists on the fusion of two other dishes: arroz chaufa (fried rice) and salchipapa (fries and sausages).

History 

Small pre-Inca ruins, as well as a defense bulwark called Trinchera Nº 3 and located in Angamos Avenue that was used by the Peruvian Army during the War of the Pacific against Chile, can be found in Surquillo.

On 12 September 1992, the DIRCOTE carried out Operation Victoria, which resulted in the capture of Shining Path leader Abimael Guzmán, who was hiding in this district.

References

See also 
Administrative divisions of Peru 

Districts of Lima